Wyaconda Township is an inactive township in Clark County, in the U.S. state of Missouri.

Wyaconda Township took its name from the Wyaconda River.

References

Townships in Missouri
Townships in Clark County, Missouri